The Senate Intelligence Committee report on Russian interference in the United States presidential election, officially titled Report of the Select Committee on Intelligence United States Senate on Russian Active Measures Campaigns and Interference in the 2016 U.S. Election, is the official report in five volumes documenting the findings and conclusions of the United States Senate Intelligence Committee concerning the Russian attack efforts against election infrastructure, Russia's use of social media to affect the election, the U.S. government's response to Russian activities, review of the Intelligence Community Assessment, and counterintelligence threats and vulnerabilities. The redacted report is 1,313 pages long. It is divided into five volumes. 

The first volume of the report was released on July 25, 2019, and the fifth and last volume was released to the public on August, 18, 2020. The Senate Intelligence Committee's investigation extended more than three years, includes interviews of more than 200 witnesses, and reviews more than one million documents. Marco Rubio, acting committee head, said that "no probe into this matter has been more exhaustive.” On the stature of the report, the Senate Intelligence Committee said the report is "the most comprehensive description to date of Russia's activities and the threat they posed".

The Republican-led Senate Intelligence Committee submitted the first part of its five-volume report in July 2019 in which it concluded that the January 2017 intelligence community assessment alleging Russian interference was "coherent and well-constructed". The first volume also concluded that the assessment was "proper", learning from analysts that there was "no politically motivated pressure to reach specific conclusions". The final and fifth volume, which was the result of three years of investigations, was released on August 18, 2020, ending one of the United States "highest-profile congressional inquiries." The Committee report found that the Russian government had engaged in an "extensive campaign" to sabotage the election in favor of Donald Trump, which included assistance from some members of Trump's own advisers.

Like the Mueller report that preceded it, the report does not find a criminal conspiracy between Russia and the Trump campaign, but it does go further than the Mueller report in detailing the ties found between Trump campaign members and Russian individuals. In particular, it describes Paul Manafort as "a grave counterintelligence threat". According to the report, "some evidence suggests" that Konstantin Kilimnik, to whom Manafort provided polling data, was directly connected to the Russian theft of Clinton-campaign emails. In addition, while Trump's written testimony in the Mueller report stated that he did not recall speaking with Roger Stone about WikiLeaks, the Senate report concludes that "Trump did, in fact, speak with Stone about WikiLeaks and with members of his Campaign about Stone's access to WikiLeaks on multiple occasions".

Contents 
The report was completely released on August 18, 2020, when the fifth volume was released.

Volume I: Russian Efforts Against Election Infrastructure 
Volume I of the report is 67 pages long. In it, the committee describes "an unprecedented level of activity against state election infrastructure" by Russian intelligence in 2016. The activity occurred in "all 50 states" and is thought by "many officials and experts" to have been "a trial run ... to probe American defenses and identify weaknesses in the vast back-end apparatus—voter-registration operations, state and local election databases, electronic poll books and other equipment" of state election systems. The report warned that the United States "remains vulnerable" in the 2020 election.

Of "particular concern" to the committee report was the Russians' hacking of three companies "that provide states with the back-end systems that have increasingly replaced the thick binders of paper used to verify voters' identities and registration status."

Volume II: Russia’s Use of Social Media 
Volume II of the report is 85 pages long.

Volume III: U.S. Government Response to Russian Activities 
Volume III of the report is 54 pages long.

Volume IV: Review of the Intelligence Community Assessment 
Volume IV of the report is 158 pages long.

Volume V: Counterintelligence Threats and Vulnerabilities 
Volume V of the report, with 966 pages, was released to the public on August 18, 2020, albeit heavily redacted. The report concluded that "the Russian government engaged in an aggressive, multi-faceted effort to influence, or attempt to influence, the outcome of the 2016 presidential election". The report investigated "many aspects of the counterintelligence threat posed by the Russian influence operation", which targeted both the Trump campaign and the election.

Findings on the hack and leak of Democratic Party material 

The Senate Intelligence Committee concluded that Russian president Vladimir Putin had ordered the 2016 Democratic National Committee cyber attacks and the subsequent leaks of stolen material damaging to Hillary Clinton's presidential campaign.

The committee described that Trump's presidential campaign "sought to maximize the impact of those leaks to aid Trump’s electoral prospects". The Trump campaign "created messaging strategies to promote and share" the material, and "encouraged further leaks". The Trump campaign tasked Trump associate Roger Stone to gather information about WikiLeaks' release of the material; Stone reported to Trump or senior campaign members.

Findings on Paul Manafort and Konstantin Kilimnik 

The Senate Intelligence Committee assessed that Trump campaign chairman Paul Manafort's "high-level access and willingness to share information with individuals closely affiliated with the Russian intelligence services" was a "grave counterintelligence threat". The foremost individual was Manafort's employee Konstantin Kilimnik, a Russian. The committee identified Kilimnik as a "Russian intelligence officer"; describing that Manafort and Kilimnik had a "close and lasting relationship" even through the 2016 election. Manafort repeatedly tried to "secretly share internal Campaign information with Kilimnik", including "sensitive internal polling data or Campaign strategy".

The Senate Intelligence Committee introduced a new allegation regarding Kilimnik, that he "may have been connected" to the Russian military intelligence's hack and leak of Democratic Party material. However, the report's discussions on this topic are redacted. Manafort's connection with the Russian hack and leak operation is "largely unknown", but possible, given "two pieces of information" the committee found; the details of such information were also redacted.

Findings on the Transition 
The report in the Transition section of the report, mentions that "Russia took advantage of members of the Transition Team's relative inexperience in government, opposition to Obama Administration policies, and Trump's desire to deepen ties with Russia to pursue unofficial channels through which Russia could conduct diplomacy."

Background on Page and Limitations on the Committee's Investigation 
Inspector General of the Department of Justice found serious FBI errors applying for surveillance on Carter Page, a former Trump campaign aide, while concluding that Page's travels in Russia and his past connections with Russian intelligence officers justified the FBI's concern. Despite Page producing electronic documents and sitting for an interview that lasted six and a half hours, "The Committee had significant challenges in its attempt to understand Page's activities, including his role as a foreign policy adviser to the Trump Campaign."

The Steele Dossier: Its Origins and Handling 
The report notes that the Steele dossier, a private intelligence report written by Christopher Steele, alleging a "well-developed conspiracy of co-operation" between the Trump campaign and the Russian government, "found that the tradecraft reflected in the dossier is generally poor relative to IC standards; the Department of Justice (DOJ) Office of the Inspector General (OIG) and many who the Committee spoke with at the FBI also found serious fault with Steele's tradecraft."

Additional Views of Senators Risch, Rubio, Blunt, Cotton, Cornyn, and Sasse 

Certain Republican members stated their finding:

 "The committee found no evidence that then-candidate Donald Trump or his campaign colluded with the Russian government in its efforts to meddle in the election."

Additional Views of Senators Heinrich, Feinstein, Wyden, Harris, and Bennet 

Under a section entitled "The Trump Campaign's Cooperation with Russia", certain Democratic Senators stated their conclusion: 

 "It is our conclusion, based on the facts detailed in the Committee's Report, that the Russian intelligence services' assault on the integrity of the 2016 U.S. electoral process[,] and Trump and his associates' participation in and enabling of this Russian activity, represents one of the single most grave counterintelligence threats to American national security in the modern era."

Reactions

President Donald Trump 
President Donald Trump, when asked about the report on August 18, 2020, said he "didn't read it".

Democrats 
Senate Minority Leader Chuck Schumer responded to the fifth volume release by saying "Despite nearly four years of repeated warnings from America’s national security officials, President Trump has failed to protect America’s elections and even opened the door for Vladimir Putin to again attack our country in the same insidious way."

Russia 
Russian state news service TASS responded to the release of the fifth volume on August 18, citing a statement by Dmitry Peskov, a spokesperson for Russian president Vladimir Putin, saying "The Kremlin regrets that as the U.S. presidential elections in November 2020 approach, more and more reports of alleged attempts by Russia to interfere in the electoral process will appear," such statements "have nothing to do with the truth."

See also 

 Second Cold War

Notes

References

External links 

 “Volume I: Russian Efforts Against Election Infrastructure”
 “Volume II: Russia’s Use of Social Media”
 “Volume III: U.S. Government Response to Russian Activities”
 "Volume IV: Review  of the Intelligence Community Assessment”
 Additional declassifications of “Volume IV: Review of Intelligence Community Assessment”
 "Volume V: Counterintelligence Threats and Vulnerabilities"
116th United States Congress
2020 in American politics
2020 documents
Electoral fraud in the United States
Foreign electoral intervention
Investigations and assessments of WikiLeaks
Russian interference in the 2016 United States elections
United States documents